Redford is a variant of the toponymic surname "Radford", though it may also arise directly from the placename "East Retford" in Nottingham, England which had an alternative spelling of "Redeford".

Notable people sharing this surname include:

born in 16th Century
John Redford (died 1547), English composer and organist

born in 18th Century
Sebastian Redford (1701–1763), English Jesuit

born in 19th Century
Alvin J. Redford (1883–1974), American politician
Harry Redford (1841–1901), also known as Captain Starlight, Australian stockman and cattle thief
James Redford (politician) (1821–1909), Canadian businessman and political figure

born in 20th Century
Craig Redford (born 1984), Entrepreneur, Australia 
Alison Redford (born 1965), Former Premier of Alberta, Canada
Angus Redford (born 1956), Australian politician
Blair Redford (born 1983), American actor
Donald B. Redford (born 1934), Canadian Egyptologist
Emmette Redford (1904–1998), American political scientist and historian
Ian Redford (actor) (born 1951), British actor
Ian Redford (born 1960), Scottish footballer
James Redford (filmmaker) (1962–2020), American documentary film maker
Robert Redford (born 1936), American film director, actor, producer
Spencer Redford (born 1983), American actress
William Redford (born 1958), British corporate executive

References

English toponymic surnames